Atilio Lombardo Nolle (1902 - 21 June 1984) was a Uruguayan professor, botanist and agrostologist.

Honors
The Pooideae genus Lombardochloa was named in his honor.
The Botanical Garden of Montevideo bears his name.

References

External links
 

1902 births
1984 deaths
Uruguayan botanists
Agrostologists
20th-century botanists